Graduate Medical Program (GMP) or sometimes also known as Graduate Entry Program (GEP) or Graduate Entry Medicine (GEM) are terms generally used outside of the United States and refer to medical programs usually of 4-years duration where applicants are university graduates who have taken aptitude tests such as the GAMSAT, UKCAT or MCAT. These aptitude tests are different from the UMAT test for high school graduates. Medical programs in the United States technically do not require the completion of a previous degree, but do require the completion of 2–3 years of pre-medical sciences at the university level and so are thus classified as Second entry degrees. However, since in places such as Australia medical applicants were historically generally high school graduates and only recently have medical schools changed to requiring the completion of a previous bachelor's degree, the terms Graduate Medical Program and Graduate Entry Medicine arose to differentiate the new courses.

Some countries currently offering 4-year medical courses for university degree holders

Europe
 Ireland
 Poland
 Czech Republic
 Netherlands
 Portugal
 Ukraine
 United Kingdom 
 Georgia 
)

Rest of World
 Australia
 Canada
 Israel
 United States
 Malaysia (Perdana University - University of San Diego)- PUGScM
 South Africa
 Singapore
 Philippines
 Ghana
 Lebanon
 UAE
 South Korea has graduated medical schools and special admission for scholar 
 Japan has special admission program for scholar
 Caribbean
 Mexico

Qatar ( Weill Cornell )

See also  
 Medical Education
 First professional degree

Medical education